The Best of ABBA is a compilation greatest hits album by Swedish pop group ABBA, first released in August 1975 in the Netherlands. It was then released in West Germany, and then in Australia and New Zealand in November 1975, before being released in Austria and India in 1976. Despite not being released in Norway, imports led the album to chart. After import copies were being sold in Scandinavia, ABBA's Greatest Hits was rush-released there in November 1975. The album topped the charts in Australia, Austria and New Zealand, and went on to be certified 24× Platinum in New Zealand and 22× Platinum in Australia. The album is tied with Dire Straits' album Brothers in Arms for being the best-selling album in New Zealand.

In Australia it spent 16 weeks at number one, and in New Zealand it topped the charts for 18 weeks. The Best of ABBA was one of the biggest selling vinyl albums in Australian history, selling over a million copies. At one stage RCA Records couldn’t keep up with the demand for the albums in the country's shops, and copies had to be pressed under licence by a rival record company. In both countries, this album charted better than all the other ABBA releases, and it also became the first ever album to be certified gold in Australia before it was even released.

The Best of ABBA was re-released in 1988 on vinyl and CD, but was only available for a short time.

Track listing
All songs written and composed by Benny Andersson & Björn Ulvaeus, except where noted.

Side 1
"Waterloo" (written by Andersson, Stig Anderson, Ulvaeus) – 2:41
"Ring Ring" (written by Andersson, Anderson, Ulvaeus, Neil Sedaka, Phil Cody) – 3:01
"Honey, Honey" (written by Andersson, Anderson, Ulvaeus) – 2:52
"Mamma Mia" (written by Andersson, Anderson, Ulvaeus) – 3:32
"People Need Love" (written by Andersson, Ulvaeus) – 2:40
"Nina, Pretty Ballerina" (written by Andersson, Ulvaeus) – 2:50

Side 2
"I Do, I Do, I Do, I Do, I Do" (written by Andersson, Anderson, Ulvaeus) – 3:15
"SOS" (written by Andersson, Anderson, Ulvaeus) – 3:22
"Dance (While the Music Still Goes On)" – 3:12
"Bang-A-Boomerang" (written by Andersson, Anderson, Ulvaeus) – 3:00
"Hasta Mañana" (written by Andersson, Anderson, Ulvaeus) – 3:05
"So Long" (written by Andersson, Ulvaeus) – 3:06

Charts

Weekly charts

Year-end charts

Sales and certifications

See also
 List of best-selling albums in Australia
 List of best-selling albums in New Zealand

References

1975 greatest hits albums
ABBA compilation albums
RCA Records compilation albums